OpenOSPFD is an ISC licensed implementation of the Open Shortest Path First Protocol. It is a network routing software suite which allows ordinary general purpose computers to be used as routers exchanging routes with other computer systems speaking the OSPF protocol.

OpenOSPFD was developed by Esben Nørby and Claudio Jeker, for the OpenBSD project. It is a companion daemon of OpenBGPD. The software was developed as an alternative to packages such as Quagga, a routing software suite which is licensed under the GPL.  OpenOSPFD is developed on OpenBSD, and ports exist for FreeBSD and NetBSD.

Goals 
The design goals of OpenOSPF include being secure (non-exploitable), reliable, lean and easy to use.  The configuration language is intended to be both powerful and easy enough for most users.

External links 

 
 openospfd for FreeBSD
 OpenOSPFd and FreeBSD
 Routing with OpenBSD using OpenOSPFD and OpenBGPD  - Paper (pdf) by Claudio Jeker (2006)
 OpenOSPF Presentation - by Claudio Jeker

BSD software
OSPFD
Free routing software
OpenBSD software using the ISC license